CACP might refer to:
Camptodactyly-arthropathy-coxa vara-pericarditis syndrome
Proteoglycan 4, extracellular protein

Organisations and government
Canadian Association of Chiefs of Police
Commission for Agricultural Costs and Prices, India
Communauté d'agglomération de Cergy-Pontoise, France
Conservation of the Asiatic Cheetah Project, Iran